The following lists events that happened during 1926 in Australia.

Incumbents

Monarch – George V
Governor-General – Henry Forster, 1st Baron Forster of Lepe (until 8 October) then John Baird, 1st Viscount Stonehaven
Prime Minister – Stanley Bruce
Chief Justice – Adrian Knox

State premiers
Premier of New South Wales – Jack Lang
Premier of Queensland – William McCormack
Premier of South Australia – John Gunn (until 28 August), then Lionel Hill
Premier of Tasmania – Joseph Lyons
Premier of Victoria – John Allan
Premier of Western Australia – Philip Collier

State governors
Governor of New South Wales – Sir Dudley de Chair
Governor of Queensland – none appointed
Governor of South Australia – Sir Tom Bridges
Governor of Tasmania – Sir James O'Grady
Governor of Victoria – George Rous, 3rd Earl of Stradbroke (until 7 April), then Arthur Somers-Cocks, 6th Baron Somers (from 28 June)
Governor of Western Australia – Sir William Campion

Events
19 April – The High Court of Australia finds in the case of Clyde Engineering Co Ltd v Cowburn that the Forty-Four Hours Week Act 1925 (NSW) was incompatible with Commonwealth legislation.
3 September – The Canberra Times is first published.
4 September – A federal referendum is held, containing two questions: Industry and Commerce and Essential Services. Neither question is passed.
13 September – Twenty-six people are killed in the Murulla railway accident.
 Helen Wayth wins the first Miss Australia Quest
 Ballerina Anna Pavlova tours Australia

Science and technology
22 June – The Council for Scientific and Industrial Research (CSIR) is founded, the precursor to today's CSIRO (Commonwealth Scientific and Industrial Research Organisation).

Arts and literature 

 William McInnes wins the Archibald Prize

Sport 
18 September – South Sydney Rabbitohs defeat University 11–5, becoming premiers of the New South Wales Rugby Football League season 1926.
25 September – Melbourne defeat Collingwood 17.17 (119) to 9.8 (62) at the VFL grand final, becoming premiers of the 1926 VFL season.
2 November – Spearfelt wins the Melbourne Cup.
 New South Wales wins the Sheffield Shield

Births 
 7 January – Joe Marston, soccer player (died 2015)
 11 January – Baillieu Myer, businessman and philanthropist (died 2022)
 3 February – Raymond Martin, chemist (died 2020)
 4 February – Dave Sands, boxer (died 1952)
 6 February – Bruce Ruxton, former soldier and president of the RSL (died 2011)
 8 February – Tony Street, politician (died 2022)
 10 February – Arvi Parbo, businessman (died 2019)
 16 February – Rayene Stewart Simpson, soldier and Victoria Cross recipient (died 1978)
 6 March – Ray O'Connor, Premier of Western Australia (1982–1983) (died 2013)
 15 March – Thelma Keane, wife of cartoonist Bil Keane and inspiration for the "Mommy" character in The Family Circus (died 2008)
 2 April – Jack Brabham, racing driver (died 2014)
 13 April – Neil Betts, rugby union player (died 2017)
 11 May – Frank Thring, actor (died 1994)
 18 June – Shirley McKechnie, dancer, choreographer and dance educator (died 2022)
 25 June – Kep Enderby, Esperantist and politician (died 2015)
 27 June – Bruce Tozer, cricketer (died 2021)
 1 July – Stan Obst, Australian rules footballer (died 2005)
 3 July – Laurence Street, jurist and former Chief Justice of the Supreme Court of New South Wales (died 2018)
 4 July – Stuart Thomas Butler, nuclear physicist (died 1982)
 9 July – Peter Mullins, decathlete (died 2012)
 12 July – Al Grassby, politician, Minister for Immigration (died 2005)
 20 July – Russ Gorman, politician (died 2017)
 31 July – Jack Pollard, sports writer and cricket historian (died 2002)
 5 August – Doug McClelland, politician
 15 August – Ted Allsopp, race walker
 27 August – Reg Watson, television producer and screenwriter (died 2019)
 8 September – Keith Adams, adventurer (died 2012)
 16 September – Sir William Cole, public servant (died 2019)
 18 September – Deirdre Jordan, academic and educator
 30 September – Frank O'Neill, swimmer
 11 October – Neville Wran, Premier of New South Wales (1976–1986) (died 2014)
 20 October – Peter Durack, politician, Attorney-General (died 2008)
 7 November – Joan Sutherland, opera singer (died 2010)
 15 November – Ivor Greenwood, politician, Attorney-General (died 1976)
 31 December – Sir Billy Snedden, politician, Leader of the Liberal Party (died 1987)

Deaths 
 9 January – William Henry Warren, engineer (born in the United Kingdom) (b. 1852)
 12 January – Sir Austin Chapman, New South Wales politician (b. 1864)
 30 April – Sir Tim Coghlan, New South Wales statistician, engineer and diplomat (died in the United Kingdom) (b. 1856)
 11 May – Sir Hugh Dixson, businessman and philanthropist (died in British Ceylon) (b. 1841)
 15 May – Joseph James Fletcher, biologist (born in New Zealand) (b. 1850)
 16 May – Joe Slater, composer and music publisher (b. 1872)
 21 May – Hugh Victor McKay, industrialist (b. 1865)
 4 June – Fred Spofforth, cricketer (died in the United Kingdom) (b. 1853)
 23 June – Lowther Clarke, Anglican archbishop (born and died in the United Kingdom) (b. 1850)
 28 June – William Archibald, South Australian politician (born in the United Kingdom) (b. 1850)
 14 July – Sir Charles Mackellar, New South Wales politician and surgeon (b. 1844)
 19 July – Ada Cambridge, author (born in the United Kingdom) (b. 1844)
 14 September – Charles Hedley, naturalist (born in the United Kingdom) (b. 1862)
 3 October – Samuel James Mitchell, 1st Chief Jusice of the Northern Territory (b. 1852)
 11 December
 Sir William McMillan, New South Wales politician and businessman (born in Ireland) (b. 1850)
 Gottlieb Schuler, journalist (born in Germany) (b. 1853)
 13 December – William Spence, trade union leader and politician (born in the United Kingdom) (b. 1846)

See also 
 List of Australian films of the 1920s

References 

 
Australia
Years of the 20th century in Australia